The St. Louis league entered its 34th year headed by President Charles DeWitt. This season the league would play out of West Side Park. Four teams to play a doubleheader on Sundays as well as a midweek doubleheader under flood lights. Ben Millers withdrew from the league but was replaced by members of the Ben Millers Eddie Hart and Eddie McHugh. They were coached by McHugh but started the season with the name Harts. John Marre's team was called Town Criers and was coached by Tom Palmer. The Spanish Club continued under the sponsorship of Burke Undertakers. Phil Kavanaugh's team changed sponsorship from Hellrungs and Grimm to the Tom Burke Taverns and went by the name Club Lotus. Final league standings for the 1937-38 St. Louis Soccer League are below.

League standings

Top Goal Scorers

External links
St. Louis Soccer Leagues (RSSSF)
The Year in American Soccer - 1937

1936-37
1936–37 domestic association football leagues
1936–37 in American soccer
St. Louis Soccer
St. Louis Soccer